"There for Me" is a song composed by Angelo La Bionda, Carmelo La Bionda and Charly Ricanek. It originally appeared on the eponymous album of Italian disco duo La Bionda, which was released in 1978. It was notably covered several times by artist Sarah Brightman. There is also a French cover from 1981, by the singer Dalida, called "Fini, La Comédie".

Sarah Brightman version
 Sarah Brightman's cover of this song first appeared on her Timeless album, featuring José Cura, and was released in 1997. It was also released as a single, with "O mio babbino caro" as the B-side track. Often on her 2000/2001 La Luna tour, Brightman would perform this duet with Josh Groban, and this was included in the La Luna: Live in Concert DVD.
Brightman and Cantonese entertainer Jacky Cheung sang "There For Me" in the city of Hong Kong on stage, at the Hong Kong Millennium Extravaganza.

While the duet with José Cura version of this song is bilingual, the other two versions are completely in English.

Hayley Westenra and Paul Potts version
Hayley Westenra and Britain's Got Talent winner Paul Potts recorded "There For Me" in Italian, as "Sei Con Me", for Potts' second album, Passione, released in 2009.

References 

1978 songs
1978 singles
1998 singles
East West Records singles
La Bionda songs
Sarah Brightman songs
Song recordings produced by Frank Peterson